The 2003 London Broncos season was the twenty-fourth in the club's history and their eighth season in the Super League. The club was coached by Tony Rea, competing in Super League VIII and finishing in 5th place. The club also got to the fifth round of the Challenge Cup.

2003 London Broncos squad

Sources: Gains & LossesSLstats - 2003 Summary

Super League VIII table

Play-offs

Source:

2003 Challenge Cup
For the fourth consecutive year, the Broncos were knocked out of the cup at the fifth round stage.

References

External links
London Broncos - Rugby League Project

London Broncos seasons
London Broncos